Markayankottai is a panchayat town in Theni district in the Indian state of Tamil Nadu.

Demographics
 India census, Markayankottai had a population of 6509. Males constitute 50% of the population and females 50%. Markayankottai has an average literacy rate of 76%, higher than the national average of 79.5%: male literacy is 86%, and female literacy is 75%.

References

Cities and towns in Theni district